Peter Turnbull may refer to:

Peter Turnbull (RAAF officer) (1917–1942), Australian fighter ace
Peter Turnbull (author) (born 1950), English novelist
 Peter Turnbull (footballer) (1873–1942), Scottish footballer